Kasib Powell (born March 18, 1981) is an American former professional basketball player and the current head coach for the Sioux Falls Skyforce in the NBA G League. Powell was born and raised in Teaneck, New Jersey, where he played basketball at Teaneck High School. He played collegiately at Butler Community College and Texas Tech University. He also enjoyed a brief career in the NBA with the Miami Heat.

Professional career
Powell has played professionally in the Adriatic League, the Greek League, the Continental Basketball Association (CBA), the USBL, the Russian Superleague, the NBA D-League, the NBA, the Bosnian League, the Chinese Basketball Association and the Israeli Basketball Super League. He played for the Dakota Wizards of the CBA during the 2005–06 season and earned All-CBA First Team honors. He averaged 22.2 points, 6.0 rebounds and 3.0 assists per game with the Sioux Falls Skyforce in the NBA D-League during the 2007–08 season and was named the league's MVP. He has also played in a number of preseason games for the Minnesota Timberwolves (2004), the Chicago Bulls (2005), the Orlando Magic (2006) and the Memphis Grizzlies (2007), but he failed to make any the teams for the NBA regular season.

Because of a depleted roster due to various injuries, the Miami Heat signed Powell to a ten-day contract in March 2008. He got his first NBA career start on March 27, 2008. On April 3, 2008, the Heat decided against signing him to a second ten-day contract, however, he was re-signed by the Heat 5 days later for the remainder of the season.

In 2009, he signed with Trikala 2000.

In October 2010 he signed with Hapoel Holon in Israel.

In October 2011 he signed with Fortress Körmend, a Hungarian basketball team.

Coaching career
On October 9, 2016, Powell was named assistant coach for the Sioux Falls Skyforce of the NBA Development League. On September 16, 2021, he was promoted to head coach.

NBA career statistics

Regular season 

|-
| align="left" | 2007–08
| align="left" | Miami
| 11 || 4 || 27.6 || .368 || .242 || .667 || 4.0 || 1.6 || .8 || .2 || 7.6

References

External links
NBA D-League Profile

Kasib Powell Basketball-reference.com

1981 births
Living people
American expatriate basketball people in Bosnia and Herzegovina
American expatriate basketball people in China
American expatriate basketball people in Greece
American expatriate basketball people in Hungary
American expatriate basketball people in Israel
American expatriate basketball people in Russia
American expatriate basketball people in Serbia
American men's basketball players
Basketball coaches from New Jersey
Basketball players from New Jersey
BC Spartak Saint Petersburg players
BC Körmend players
Butler Grizzlies men's basketball players
CBA All-Star Game players
Dakota Wizards (CBA) players
Greek Basket League players
Hapoel Holon players
KK FMP (1991–2011) players
Miami Heat players
P.A.O.K. BC players
Sioux Falls Skyforce coaches
Sioux Falls Skyforce players
Small forwards
Sportspeople from Bergen County, New Jersey
Teaneck High School alumni
Texas Tech Red Raiders basketball players
Trikala B.C. players
Undrafted National Basketball Association players
Zhejiang Lions players